Kwangmyong station may refer to the following train stations:

 Kwangmyong station (Kosan County), North Korea
 Kwangmyong station (Pyongyang), North Korea
 Gwangmyeong station, South Korea